Trike may refer to:

Vehicles with three wheels and seated
 Drift trike, a type of recreational tricycle with no pedals
 Electric trike
 Motorized tricycle
 Three-wheeler
 Tricycle (non-motorized)
 Ultralight trike, a type of powered hang glider

Music
 Trike (album), by Bob Log III
 Trike (EP), by You Am I

Other uses
 Triceratops, a dinosaur with three horns
 Trichloroethylene, a chemical compound commonly used as a solvent

See also

 
 
 Tricycle (disambiguation)
 Trikke, a three-wheeled scooter-like vehicle powered by shifting bodyweight
 Twike, a three-wheeled hybrid velomobile
 Autocycle (disambiguation)